Rural Solidarity (full name Independent Self-governing Trade Union of Individual Farmers "Solidarity") is a trade union of Polish farmers, established in late 1980 as part of the growing Solidarity movement. Its legalization became possible on February 19, 1981, when officials of the government of the People's Republic of Poland signed the so-called Rzeszów - Ustrzyki Dolne Agreement with striking farmers. Previously, Communist government had refused farmers’ right to self-organize, which caused widespread strikes, with the biggest wave taking place in January 1981. The Rural Solidarity was officially recognized on May 12, 1981, and, strongly backed by the Catholic Church of Poland, it claimed to represent at least half of Poland's 3.2 million smallholders.

Background 
After World War II, Poland became a communist country, a satellite of the Soviet Union. Since collective farming is a key component of communist notion of agriculture, in June 1948, the Polish United Workers' Party decided to begin the process. From the very beginning, compulsory collectivization faced strong resistance of Polish farmers, who did not want to give up their land. Despite using different methods of persuasion, the progress was slow. By 1951, only 1% of arable land was collectivized, with some 23 000 farmers working there.  Altogether, in that year there were some 2200 collective farms. Most of them were located in western and northern Poland, in the Recovered Territories, where population consisted of people resettled from former eastern borderlands of Poland.

After the Polish October, Władysław Gomułka officially declared that private farms were part of the so-called "Polish road to Socialism" and the government gradually changed its stance. In the late 1950s, number of collective farms fell to 1 800, and Poland was the only country of the Soviet Bloc which tolerated private ownership of the arable land. In 1958, Moscow ordered the resumption of collectivization, but unlike her neighbors, Poland refused. By 1960, collectivization in Poland was ended, never to be resumed, and Engels' opinion that peasants would spontaneously create collective forms of agricultural production because of the threat of the big landed estates was not confirmed in Poland.

Preservation of individual agriculture was a key factor in future events. Nevertheless, forced collectivization of farmland had disastrous consequences, as Poland, traditionally a grain exporter, had to import food, including grain, to prevent famine.

Origins of the Rural Solidarity 
In August 1980, workers of the Vladimir Lenin Gdańsk Shipyard began a strike, which resulted in creation of Solidarity (see: History of Solidarity). After this event, a group of farmers, gathered in the Farmers Self-Defence Committees decided to set up their own, parallel union called Rural Solidarity. At that time, other similar farmers organizations emerged, such as Peasants Solidarity and Union of Agricultural Producers Solidarity. Their objectives were:
 recognition of private farming as a lasting part of the national economy,
 legal protection of inheritance of land.

On September 24, 1980, representatives of Polish individual farmers submitted documents to the Warsaw Provincial Court for registration as Rural Solidarity. However, after one month, at the end of October, the court ruled that private farmers were self-employed and as such, were not entitled to organize their own labor union. The disappointed farmers turned to the Supreme Court.

On November 30,  Deputy Minister of Agriculture Andrzej Kacala met with a group of 30 representatives of farmers' unions founding committees from the Warsaw, Lublin, Siedlce, Skierniewice, and Wałbrzych Voivodeships, as well as from the Września–Konin, Golub-Dobrzyń–Kujawy, and the Holy Cross Mountains regions. The representatives informally called themselves Rural Solidarity.

Supported by Lech Wałęsa and the factory workers, the farmers organized on December 14, 1980, the founding congress of Rural Solidarity in Warsaw. It was attended by 1000 delegates, who represented around 600 000 private farmers. Among their demands, there was a call for formal registration of their independent union. However, on December 30, 1980, the Supreme Court announced that its ruling on Rural Solidarity had been postponed. As a result, tensions rose rise between the peasants and local governments across the country.

Creation of the organization 
Southeastern part of Poland was the area in which individual farmers were very numerous and where position of the Roman Catholic Church was the strongest. Therefore, in early 1981, main center of farmers’ protests was established in the city of Rzeszów, where the strike and the sit-in began on January 5, 1981 and where the center of the movement was established. As Time magazine reported on Monday, February 2, 1981, members of Solidarity and Rural Solidarity occupied "Headquarters of the old official trade union" (in fact, it was The House of the Railroad Worker), where they placed a sign which said: "SOLIDARITY IS MORE THAN JUST A NAME". The united front of both organizations demanded negotiations toward legitimizing the farmers' union.

Other centers of farmers protests were also located in southeastern Poland, in the towns of Ustrzyki Dolne and Nowy Sącz, but Solidarity members had been evicted from occupied buildings there. It must be noticed that the Solidarity trade union, and its leaders, such as Lech Wałęsa, fully supported demands of it the peasants. As one Solidarity official said, "We got in touch with our people in all of the major factories around here and let them know that if the police interfered here there would be a general strike without further notice".

Rzeszów-Ustrzyki Agreement 
At the beginning of 1981, peasants striking in Rzeszów joined forces with their comrades from Ustrzyki Dolne, who had been on strike since December 28, 1980, occupying the local government office. The strike in Ustrzyki became known across the country. In different locations in Poland, several strikes broke out (including a hunger strike in Świdnica), and on February 18, 1981, negotiations began. The peasants were helped by such personalities, as Lech Wałęsa, Andrzej Gwiazda, Andrzej Stelmachowski and Jadwiga Staniszkis. Also, among supporters of the peasants, was Primate Stefan Wyszyński, who on February 6, 1981, confirmed "the right of the farmers to found freely their own associations".

The Rzeszów-Ustrzyki Agreement was signed in the night of February 18/19 (in Ustrzyki) and February 20 (in Rzeszów). The government, represented by Minister of Agriculture Andrzej Kacala, did not give permission to creation of a free trade union of the peasants, but legal protection of inheritance of land was confirmed. Other concessions included permission to construct more churches in the countryside and promise of equal treatment of individual farmers. Another concession won by the farmers was the government's promise to reduce its "pleasure lands" and reduce the number of facilities selling alcohol. Nevertheless, the state refused to register the organization, stating that the farmers were not wage earners and therefore could not be unionized.

The Agreement was signed by Minister Kacala, who represented the Government, and Jozef Slisz, Jan Kulaj, Antoni Kopaczewski, Bogdan Lis and Lech Wałęsa. Due to its significance, it is sometimes called the "Constitution of the Polish Countryside".

Legalization of Rural Solidarity 
However, Rural Solidarity was not legalized until May 12, 1981, after another farmers strike, this time in Bydgoszcz, where it resulted in a major incident, which sparked off the 1981 warning strike in Poland. Its first leader became Jan Kułaj, and the union was banned on December 13, 1981 (see: Martial Law in Poland). Among those who supported restoration of the Rural Solidarity, was Pope John Paul II, who called for it during his 1987 visit to Poland, saying: "A Pope cannot remain quiet about this even if he were not a Pole".

Rural Solidarity returned in 1989 (see: Polish Round Table Agreement), and has existed since then. Among its leaders, there are Gabriel Janowski, Artur Balazs, Roman Bartoszcze, and Roman Wierzbicki.

See also 
Cold War
Soviet Empire
Poznań 1956 protests
Polish 1970 protests
Lublin 1980 strikes

References 

1980 in Poland
Agrarian politics
Solidarity (Polish trade union)